Daniel Osvaldo Scioli (born 13 January 1957) is an Argentine politician, sportsman, and businessman. He was Vice President of Argentina from 2003 to 2007 and Governor of Buenos Aires Province from 2011 to 2015. Since September 2022 (and previously, from 2020 to June 2022) he has been Argentina's ambassador to Brazil.

He has also served two tenures as president of the Justicialist Party. He was the candidate to the presidency for the Front for Victory ticket in the 2015 general elections, and lost to Mauricio Macri in a runoff election. From June to September 2022, he briefly served as Minister of Production in the cabinet of Alberto Fernández.

Family
Scioli was born in Villa Crespo, Buenos Aires. He spent his first years in a middle class home located at the corner of Corrientes and Humboldt. His grandfather ran an electrical hardware store, which over time grew into a store selling electrical appliances that was to become the family business. Scioli has described himself as a loyal man devoted to his stable and intimate circle, and an understanding but demanding father.

In 1975, his brother José Scioli was kidnapped by a cell of the Montoneros guerrilla group. Daniel Scioli, then aged 18, carried out the negotiations with the kidnappers to free his brother. José was released in exchange for a cash payment by their father.

He was married to former model and entrepreneur Karina Rabolini and has an extramarital daughter, Lorena. Scioli refused to recognize his daughter, but he was eventually forced by law to recognize her. She was then accepted by Scioli as his daughter when she was 18 years old. Regarding this issue, he says, "It helped me to grow and to give me peace of mind. My relation with Lorena improved my life, and that’s why now I can also enjoy Father’s Day".

Education
Scioli attended Colegio Ward's primary school in Villa Sarmiento, where he lived until he was 17 years old. For his secondary schooling, he graduated from the Escuela Superior de Comercio Carlos Pellegrini with a diploma in commercial expertise, having attained one of the three best grade averages. 
He started studies in marketing at the Universidad Argentina de la Empresa (U.A.D.E.) in Buenos Aires; in October 2015 he graduated finishing his final exams. Scioli and Ricardo Orosco, head of the UADE, were denounced for a possible degree forgery, as several topics of study approved by him are no longer part of the scheduled studies.

Sports career

His interest in sports began at the Villa Crespo club. He took part in swimming, tennis, basketball and a form of badminton, representing his city in each. His passion for offshore powerboat racing took off when a friend invited him for a ride in a powerboat. Some time later he competed in his first Offshore Powerboat race in Mar del Plata, in which he finished last. "This made me very angry, so I decided to train until I started winning, and finally ended up as the world champion," he states.

Scioli started to compete in offshore powerboat racing in 1986 in 1987 he joined the Italian powerboat designer, builder and engineer Fabio Buzzi who ran FB Design, one of the most successful powerboat racing teams in the world.

On December 4, 1989, he lost his right arm in an accident while racing on the Paraná river in the 1000 km Delta Argentino race. A wave produced by an oil tanker is believed to have overturned his boat. A fitted prosthesis enabled Scioli to pursue his love of offshore powerboat racing.

Even with this handicap he won many offshore powerboat racing championships in various categories. On board La Gran Argentina, a Fabio Buzzi-designed FB 55, Daniel Scioli was a three-time winner of the World Superboat USA Championship and captured 4 European titles. The boat's hull was modified in 2000 into a long-distance record setter. Scioli went on to set the Miami-Nassau-Miami record with an average speed of 100 mph.

Business career
In the field of business his activity was linked to the electrical appliances market. In 1991, the Swedish company Electrolux, which had left the Argentine market on account of the country's instability, nominated him as the agent of its brand for Argentina. 
In 1994 Scioli encouraged the firm to re-establish in Argentina, an effort which gave rise to Electrolux Argentina, of which he became the director, a post he held until 1997.

Political career

Scioli's political career took off in 1997, when he ran for a seat in the Argentine Chamber of Deputies on behalf of the Justicialist Party in the City of Buenos Aires. He was elected and on December 10 of that year he became a Deputy in the Argentine Congress. He was nominated president of the Sports Committee of the House for a two-year tenure, a nomination that was renewed for another two-year period on the basis of a unanimous vote.

Having been re-elected as a Deputy in 2001, in December 2001 he became a minister as the Secretary of Sports and Tourism.

In 2003 the formula Kirchner-Scioli running on the Front for Victory ticket won the presidential election. Thus Scioli became Argentina's vice-president and the President of the Senate.

In 2007, upon Néstor Kirchner's retirement as president, Daniel Scioli was elected Governor of the Province of Buenos Aires, considered one of the most influential political jobs in Argentina. Following disappointing results for the ruling Front for Victory (FPV) in the June 28, 2009, mid-term elections, Scioli replaced Kirchner as President of the Justicialist Party (to which the FPV belongs).

Scioli was the FPV candidate in the 2015 Argentine presidential election, and was endorsed by incumbent President Cristina Fernández de Kirchner. The initial polls pointed him as a favourite, with some predicting he would win enough votes to win outright and avoid a ballotage. However, he only narrowly won the first round, forcing him into a ballotage against Buenos Aires mayor Mauricio Macri. The ballotage round was held on November 22. Scioli narrowly lost to Macri, and conceded the race with 70% of the votes counted.

Electoral career

Executive

Legislative

References

External links

Site of the team of Daniel Scioli
Videos of Daniel Scioli
Site of Photographs of Daniel Scioli
Twitter of Daniel Scioli
Facebook of Daniel Scioli
Youth for Scioli. Group that supports Daniel Scioli
Biography by CIDOB (in Spanish)

|-

|-

|-

|-

|-

1957 births
21st-century Argentine politicians
Argentine motorboat racers
Argentine people of Italian descent
Argentine sportsperson-politicians
Candidates for President of Argentina
Governors of Buenos Aires Province
Justicialist Party politicians
Living people
Members of the Argentine Chamber of Deputies elected in Buenos Aires
Members of the Argentine Chamber of Deputies elected in Buenos Aires Province
Politicians from Buenos Aires
Politicians with disabilities
Sportspeople from Buenos Aires
Vice presidents of Argentina
Ambassadors of Argentina to Brazil